Pre-conception counseling (also called pre-conceptual counseling) is a meeting with a health-care professional (generally a physician or midwife) by a woman before attempting to become pregnant. It generally includes a pre-conception risk assessment for any potential complications of pregnancy as well as modifications of risk factors, such as increasing folic acid intake to reduce the risk of neural tube defects and counseling on smoking cessation, alcohol reduction, and medications that may compromise fetal development. Physicians, midwives and baby experts recommend that a woman visit them as soon as the woman is contemplating having a child, and optimally around 3 to 6 months before actual attempts are made to conceive. This time frame allows a woman to better prepare her body for successful conception (fertilization) and pregnancy, and allows her to reduce any health risks which are within her control. Agencies such as the March of Dimes have developed screening tools that healthcare providers can use with their patients. In addition, obstetricians or midwives (see Obstetrics, Midwifery, General Practitioner) have developed comprehensive check-lists and assessments for the woman who is planning to become pregnant.

In one sense, pre-conception counseling and assessment can be compared to a well-baby visit in which a baby is screened for normal health, normal development, with the benefit of identifying emerging problems that may have gone unnoticed in an infant. For a woman, the Pre-Conception Counseling Assessment and Screening is intended to assess normal health of a child-bearing woman, while at the same time identifying:

Existing or emerging illness or disease which may have gone undetected before, and
Existing risks for the woman who may become pregnant, and
Existing risks which may affect a fetus if the woman does become pregnant.

Obstacles to pre-conception counseling

A common obstacle to pre-conception counseling and assessment is that many pregnancies are still unplanned. Globally, 38% of pregnancies are unintended. For this reason, many experts recommend that all women of childbearing age be offered preconception care counseling regardless of intent to become pregnant.

Another common obstacle to pre-conception counseling and assessment is of women not knowing, realizing, or understanding the benefits of visiting their physician or midwife before trying to become pregnant. Most women still take for granted the biological aspects of becoming pregnant, and do not consider the value of pre-screening before becoming pregnant. Most women who want and anticipate having a baby are naturally prone to thinking in terms of having a well baby. In the majority of cases, women do not think about having a baby who has any kind of problem. Most women do not know how their own medical history could pose risks to a developing fetus. Likewise, they may not understand that pregnancy carries a certain number of risks as well. When family history risks and pregnancy risks are considered together, it may point to potential problems for that particular woman, or to her unborn baby once she becomes pregnant.

What is involved in pre-conception counseling?

Questionnaire
Pre-screening covers many body-system areas (not just the reproductive organs), as well as aspects of the woman's lifestyle, and family history information. It begins with basic information and becomes more in-depth, especially if the woman has had previous illnesses, diseases, etc. Pre-screening assessments begin with a questionnaire which the woman fills out, generally before seeing the physician or midwife. Some offices have the woman go over parts of the questionnaire with a Nurse Practitioner, if available.

Blood work
Certain blood work may be ordered. Preconception counseling and testing identify couples at risk for hemoglobinopathies that might affect their offspring. This often includes a CBC (Complete Blood Count) which can show anemia. A CBC includes WBC (White Blood Cell Count) which can show the presence of infection. Anemia and infection, indicating problems with the woman's overall health at that moment, can both affect a woman's ability to become pregnant at that time as well as affect the stability of the pregnancy and the health of the fetus. In the majority of cases, both infection and anemia can be treated once the cause is identified. Anemia may require ongoing evaluation and iron supplement. Based on these results, patients may be offered genetic counseling, hematology consultation, and fetal diagnostic testing.

Urinalysis
Urine sample or urinalysis can reveal the presence of proteinuria (protein in the urine), a possible indicator of infection or kidney disease, or the presence of blood which can indicate a urinary tract infection. Urinalysis might also show the presence of glucose (glycosuria), but women of child-bearing age are unlikely to have undiagnosed diabetes (this is separate from gestational diabetes that may occasionally develop during the course of a subsequent pregnancy).

Using the assessment

Physicians
When women have pre-existing illnesses / conditions / diseases, these may add to pre-natal risks and will need ongoing evaluation. Also any medications which are used to treat these conditions will need monitored and possibly reduced or increased.

The presence of Diabetes remains a huge risk for the unborn child, and a woman will be screened specifically for this condition. Known diabetics will need monitored closely. For more information, see this online article Diabetes and Diabetic risks.

The woman's role
A woman may need to adjust certain aspects of her health and well-being which are in her control. These usually include aspects of lifestyle, drug and alcohol use, exercise, rest and stress reduction. In addition, she may need to discontinue certain herbs or over-the-counter medications as recommended by her healthcare provider. Many physicians will also recommend pre-natal vitamins before a woman actually conceives in order to boost her overall health.

In the United States

Pre-conception counseling in the United States is recommended to include:
 Height and weight to calculate BMI
 Blood pressure
 Medical history
 Abdominal and pelvic examination
 Rubella screening
 Varicella screening
 Domestic violence screening
 Depression screening
 Testing for Gonorrhea and Chlamydia for women at high risk for STDs

See also
List of counseling topics
Genetic testing
Pre-implantation genetic diagnosis

References

Counseling
Maternal health
Midwifery